Salient Nunatak is a prominent cusp-shaped nunatak which stands out from the north side of Ohio Range, Horlick Mountains, 3 nautical miles (6 km) northeast of Mount Glossopteris. Mapped by United States Geological Survey (USGS) from surveys and U.S. Navy aerial photographs, 1958–59. Named by the New Zealand Antarctic Place-Names Committee (NZ-APC) following geological work in the area by a New Zealand Antarctic Research Program (NZARP) field party, 1983–84.

Nunataks of Marie Byrd Land